Ellen Ruth Rockwood (1872 - April 13, 1952) was a librarian.

Early life
Ellen Ruth Rockwood was born in 1872 in Rensselaer Falls, New York.

Rockwood obtained a A.B. degree from Bryn Mawr College.

Career
E. Ruth Rockwood was the Head of the Reference department, of the Library Association of Portland, which she joined in 1901. She held the position until retirement in 1938.

She was a member of the American Association of University Women and of the Professional Women's League.

She contributed to the Pacific Historical Review and to the Oregon Historical Society Quarterly for which she edited Diary of the Rev. George H. Atkinson, 1847- 1858 and Letters of Charles Stevens.

Always for the Oregon Historical Society, Rockwood completed an exhaustive compilation of Oregon State Documents. It was published by the State of Oregon as an official document under the title of A Checklist of Oregon State Documents.

She was in charge of the Pacific Northwest Library Association Bibliography; the original collection was built by Rockwood at the Library Association in Portland, and served as assistance to collectors and librarians of the smaller libraries.

In 1916 she was appointed chairman of the Pacific Northwest Library Association.

In December 1928 Rockwood was a charter member of the Subscription Books Committee, a group to provide evaluations and advice on encyclopedias, subscription sets, and allied compends, newly founded by the American Library Association (ALA).

Personal life
E. Ruth Rockwood moved to Oregon in 1886 and she lived at Alexandra Court Hotel, Portland, Oregon. 

She died on April 13, 1952 and is buried at Mountain View Cemetery (Ashland, Oregon), in the Old Cemetery side, Lot 343.

References

1872 births
1952 deaths
Bryn Mawr College alumni
American librarians
American women librarians
People from St. Lawrence County, New York
People from Portland, Oregon